Taoyuan Sports Park is a station on the Taoyuan Airport MRT located in Zhongli, Taoyuan City, Taiwan. It opened for commercial service on 2 March 2017.

Overview
This elevated station has two side platforms with two tracks. Only Commuter trains stop at this station. It opened for trial service on February 2, 2017, and for commercial service March 2, 2017.

Construction on the station began on September 18, 2008, and opened for commercial service on March 2, 2017 with the opening of the Taipei-Huanbei section of the Airport MRT.

Around the station
 Carrefour Qingpu Store (50m west of the station)
 Global Mall Taoyuan A19 (220m west of the station)
 Blue Pond Park (350m northeast of the station)
 Taoyuan International Baseball Stadium (400m southwest of the station)
 Qingpu Sports Park (500m west of the station)
 Taiwan Land Art Garden (3.2km southwest of the station)

Exits
Exit 1: Section 2, High Speed Rail South Road

See also
 Taoyuan Metro

References

Railway stations opened in 2017
2017 establishments in Taiwan
Taoyuan Airport MRT stations